Mahapeeth Tarapeeth was a Bengali mythological show that was aired on Star Jalsha and is also available on Disney+ Hotstar. The show narrates the origin of Tarapith shrine- the journey from fear to faith and chart the various phases of Maa Tara and Bamakhepa’s journey to fight against societal evils. This show was produced by Max Entertainment, Surinder Films.

Plot
The show revolves around the manifestation of the unparalleled Tarapith, which according to legends is home to one of the 51 parts (Tara-eyeball) of Maa Sati. It depicts how the Tantric Hindu temple became the revered Shakti Peeth by regaling tales known and unknown that surround it.

Set in 19th century Bengal, the show narrates the journey of the omnipotent goddess’ origin and her miracles, her connection with her ardent devotee Bamakhepa and the obstacles they overcome to abolish malpractices and superstitions in tumultuous times.

Cast
Nabanita Das as Maa Tara
Dhrubojyoti Sarkar  as Mahadev
Jasmine Roy as Maa durga
 Sabyasachi Chowdhury as Bama Charan Chotopadhay / Sadhak Bamakhyapa / Bama / Bamdev
Sarbik Pal as Child Bama
Sayak Chakraborty as Lord Krishna 
Pradip Dhar as morol moshai of Atla village
Jeetu Kamal as Anandanath / Choto Kumar (deceased)
Roosha Chatterjee as Rani Annada Sundari
Kushal Chakraborty as Sarbanandho Chotopadhay (Bama's father) (deceased)
Aditi Chatterjee as Rajkumari (Bama's Mother) (Deceased)
Indranil Mallick as Bama's childhood friend
Arindam Halder as Neel Madhob
Anindya Banerjee as Durga Das
Sagnik Chatterjee as Borendronath / Boro Kumar
 Riju Biswas as Birendranath
Suchandra Banerjee as Labanya
Sourav Chatterjee as Labanya's husband
Gourob Chatterjee as Rabindranath Tagore 
Palash Debnath as the Nayeb of young Rabindranath Tagore
Niladri Lahiri as Debendranath Tagore
Goutam Halder as Aghoreshwar Thakur
Samir Biswas as Tantraguru of Aghoreswar
Debraj Mukherjee as Rudranath
Mousumi Bhattacharya / Indrakshi Nag as Madhobi: Bama's Boro rani maa
Mishmee Das
Avijit Sarkar
Mimi Dutta 
Rupankar Bagchi
Biswabasu Biswas
Aritra Dutta
Sambhabhi
Dev Chhat as greedy Zamindar 
Ayesha Bhattacharya as Dakini
Soumi Chakraborty as Yogini
Sayantani Sengupta as Lalita
Saptarshi Ray as Borothakur of Tarapeeth
Surojit Banerjee
Kaushambi Chakroborty / Alokananda Guha as Maa Bipatarini
Sohini Banerjee as Jhunjhuni
Judhajit Banerjee
Arijit Chowdhury
Bimal Chakraborty as Kapalik
Hirojeet Chatterjee
Deerghoi Paul
Tramila Bhattacharya 
Sanchita Bhattacharya as payesh mata
Priyanka Chakraborty
Biplab Chatterjee as Bishnu Das
Avrajit Chakraborty as Shymananda
Sumanta Mukherjee as Nidhu Sardar
Sancharee Mukherjee as Sulakkhana's mother
Anamika Saha
Nishantika Das
Anamika Chakraborty
Partha Sarathi Deb
Moumita Chakrabarty 
Arindam Ganguly 
Pallavi Sharma
Sudip Mukherjee
Raja Goswami as Tarananda
Biswarup banerjee as  mahadevananda(mahadev thakur)
Madhupriya Chowdhury

Reception
In week 22 of 2021, the series has risen to fifth place with 3.546 million impressions for the most watched television series in Bengal.

References

External links
 

Star Jalsha original programming
Indian television series about Hindu deities
2019 Indian television series debuts
2022 Indian television series endings
Bengali-language television programming in India